The ISU Junior Grand Prix (JGP) in Russia (titled Cup of Mordovia in 2016) is an international figure skating competition sanctioned by the International Skating Union. Russia organized the JGP Final for the first time in December 2012, in Sochi, and will host a qualifying event in September 2016 in Saransk. Medals may be awarded in the disciplines of men's singles, ladies' singles, pair skating, and ice dancing.

Junior medalists

Men

Ladies

Pairs

Ice dancing

References

External links 
 ISU Junior Grand Prix at the International Skating Union
 Figure Skating Federation of Russia 

Russia
JGP